Degrassi Junior High is a Canadian television series created by Kit Hood and Linda Schuyler. The second series in the Degrassi franchise and the first to be set in a universe that has spanned multiple decades, it aired for three seasons on the CBC from 18 January 1987 to 27 February 1989, and on PBS in the United States starting from September 1987. A non-union production by Hood and Schuyler's Playing With Time, Inc, Kate Taylor of WGBH Boston also served as the show's executive producer, and the series was produced in association with the Corporation for Public Broadcasting with participation of Telefilm Canada. 

The series centred around an ensemble cast of seventh, eighth, and later ninth grade students attending the titular Degrassi Junior High School, as they faced various issues and challenges including substance abuse, child abuse, teenage pregnancy, homophobia, and racism. The series often mixed comedy and drama, with serious storylines often balanced with more light-hearted secondary plots. The series was developed by Hood and Schuyler in response to what they perceived to be a lack of proper educational programming targeted toward teenagers. The cast was drawn from a repertory company that comprised age-appropriate actors with little to no prior acting experience, who undertook acting workshops before each season commenced filming. The building used for the school was the partially vacant Vincent Massey Public School in Toronto, Ontario, with the rest of the series shot entirely on-location in and around the Greater Toronto Area, specifically the Queen-Broadview Village, where the eponymous De Grassi Street is located. 

The show was acclaimed almost immediately following its debut, with critics praising it for its realistic and diverse portrayal of teenage issues in contrast to other programs of the time period. Enamored by the show themselves, the CBC had it moved from its Sunday afternoon time slot to prime time Monday night in between two popular American sitcoms, despite Schuyler's doubts it would succeed in the new slot. Following this move, its viewership increased by 40 percent, and by 1988, it was the highest-rated drama series in Canada, with ratings consistently in the millions. The show was also a ratings success internationally, including in the United Kingdom; on the BBC, the series received a peak of six million viewers, prior to the network refusing to air several first-season episodes and utimately dropping it. The series' actors were brought to celebrity status in their home country, receiving adulation from fans on a level compared to Beatlemania. The cast also participated in many public appearances to promote various causes; in 1989, they were named ambassadors for the Ontario branch of UNICEF. The show also spawned a series of paperback novelizations, and was incorporated into health curricula by schools. The series received twenty-eight awards during its run, including eight Gemini Awards (including two won by actors Pat Mastroianni and Stacie Mistysyn) and an International Emmy for the 1987 episode "It's Late". It was succeeded by Degrassi High, which debuted on 6 November 1989 and focused on the same characters in high school. 

Degrassi Junior High and its sequel maintained a significant cult following into the 1990s as it continued to be broadcast in re-runs and syndication. As the decade progressed, an online community developed around the series and led to several public reunions taking place. One of these reunions, which occurred on the CBC teenage talk show Jonovision in 1999, became a catalyst for the development of the reboot series Degrassi: The Next Generation, which premiered in 2001 and features several characters from the original series as adults. Although not generally acknowledged by the mainstream, Degrassi Junior High has been frequently referred to as a pioneer of the teen drama genre that prefigured later and better-known series such as Beverly Hills, 90210 and Dawson's Creek. In 2017, the series was named by the Toronto International Film Festival as one of Canada's most significant contributions to the cinematic landscape.

Premise 
The show centred around an ethnically and economically diverse group of students from East End Toronto attending the fictional Degrassi Junior High School as they confronted a multitude of social issues, including, but not limited to, teenage pregnancy, child abuse, homosexuality, shoplifting, drug abuse and alcohol abuse. Co-creator Linda Schuyler outlined the show's mandate as informing its adolescent viewers as opposed to directly advising them not to make controversial choices. Schuyler and Hood saw Degrassi Junior High as a response to what they felt was a lack of television series that addressed adolescent issues from the adolescent's perspective, always usually dominated with an adult centred moralistic mentality. 

Amanda Stepto, who played the character Christine "Spike" Nelson, stated in 1989 that the series was intended as a conversation starter for kids and their parents to discuss topics that would otherwise not usually be mentioned. 

Each episode would begin with a 30–60-second cold open which would set up the A-plot by establishing the issues the plot would address. Following the opening sequence, the story would concern the A-plot, before making way for the B-plot, which would have some connection to the A-plot. Sometimes, there would be a C-plot, which leaned more toward comic relief. There would be a crisis at mid-point in time for the commercial break. The episode would end on a freeze-frame of a character involved in the A-plot.

The first two seasons span an entire year, with some characters in Grade 7, and others in Grade 8. For the third season, Grade 9, which is typically the first year of high school in Canada, was added to the junior high school as a creative decision. In the third season, which is set the year after the first two seasons, the Grade 9 students attend a nearby high school part-time, and new Grade 7 characters are introduced.

In the series finale, the Degrassi Junior High School building is destroyed by a fire started by a faulty boiler, during a school dance.

Cast

Sixty-five overall teenagers from Toronto comprised the Playing With Time Repertory Company and mostly would appear as either extras or minor characters. The series did not have a fixed cast, and instead focused loosely on a select group. Minor characters would occasionally become the main focus or would be generally given an increased role overtime; by contrast, major characters would sometimes only be seen in the background, or phased out almost entirely. Unlike the trend of casting young adults to play teenagers, Degrassi Junior High cast real age-appropriate actors with little-to-no prior acting experience, a trend that was later continued in the development of Degrassi: The Next Generation in reaction to the teen dramas throughout the 1990s. The actors were not a part of any unions. 

Pat Mastroianni portrayed Joey Jeremiah, a fedora-wearing class clown who is later held back in the third season and is the keyboardist and founder of The Zit Remedy. Stacie Mistysyn portrayed Caitlin Ryan, a high-achiever and passionate activist who has epilepsy. Amanda Stepto portrayed Christine "Spike" Nelson, a punk rock girl with large spiked hair who becomes pregnant and deals with the social stigma and responsibilities of being a teenage mother. Stefan Brogren portrayed Archie "Snake" Simpson, The Zit Remedy's guitarist and later the longest-running character in the franchise, Neil Hope portrayed Derek "Wheels" Wheeler, the bassist of The Zit Remedy whose parents are killed by a drunk driver and is a friend of Joey and Snake's. Nicole Stoffman portrayed Stephanie Kaye, a provocatively dressed queen bee who is school president. Stoffman would leave the series after the second season to star in the CTV sitcom Learning the Ropes.

Rebecca Haines-Saah portrayed Kathleen Mead, a "snooty mean girl" who deals with her alcoholic mother and later anorexia nervosa. Sara Ballingall portrayed Melanie Brodie, Kathleen's naive friend. Twins Angela & Maureen Deiseach portrayed Erica & Heather Farrell. Anais Granofsky portrayed Lucy Fernandez, a relatively wealthy girl who is usually always a latchkey kid. Bill Parrott portrayed Shane McKay, Spike's boyfriend who later suffers brain damage from a fall. Other actors included Irene Courakos, who portrayed Alexa Pappadopoulos, Amanda Cook, who portrayed Lorraine "L.D" Delacorte, Dayo Ade, who portrayed Bryant Lister "B.L.T." Thomas, Maureen McKay who portrayed Michelle Accette, and Kyra Levy, who portrayed Maya Goldberg.

The series also features characters that would not appear in the later series of the franchise. Tyson Talbot, who portrayed Billy Martin on The Kids Of Degrassi Street, appeared briefly in Degrassi Junior High as Jason Cox. Talbot quit the series after three episodes. Craig Driscoll portrayed Rick Munro, a troubled Grade 7 boy and a love interest of Caitlin who leaves after season 2. Niki Kemeny portrayed Voula Grivogiannis, Stephanie Kaye's best friend who has a love-hate relationship with her, and who left after season 1, save for a voice-only appearance in season 2. Sarah Charlesworth, who originally played the role of Casey in The Kids Of Degrassi Street, played Susie Rivera, Caitlin's best friend, but left after season 2; conversely, her brother Christopher Charlesworth played Scooter Webster, an accelerated student who was introduced in season 2 and appeared through Degrassi High.

The second season introduced new characters. Michael Carry portrayed Simon Dexter, a model and later boyfriend of Alexa. Cathy Keenan portrayed Liz O'Rourke, who becomes Spike's best friend. Darrin Brown portrayed Dwayne Myers, a school bully who fights Joey Jeremiah in an episode of the second season and occasionally appears in the background, before getting a prominent role in Degrassi High.

Throughout the series, there are three prominent teachers. Dan Woods portrayed Dan Raditch, a teacher who later becomes the vice principal of Degrassi High School, and then principal of Degrassi Community School. Michelle Goodeve portrayed Karen Avery, and Roger Montgomery portrayed Mr. Garcia, a Grade 9 teacher who only appears in the third season. People involved with the series would often make background cameos, including art director Judy Shiner, picture editor Rob de Lint, and writer Kathryn Ellis. Susin Nielsen, a writer for the series, starred as the school's janitor, Louella Hawkins, and had a speaking part in two different episodes.

Development

Concept 

Schoolteacher Linda Schuyler and her partner Kit Hood founded the company Playing With Time, Inc. in 1976. Together, the two created the Degrassi franchise in 1979 with the special Ida Makes a Movie, which along with three other annual specials, spawned The Kids of Degrassi Street, which featured several future Degrassi actors including Stacie Mistysyn, Neil Hope, Anais Granofsky, and Sarah Charlesworth. The series was a critical success, with the episode "Griff Makes A Date" winning an International Emmy Award. The production team also featured editor Yan Moore, who became the head writer of the next series, as well as the co-creator of Degrassi: The Next Generation.The final six episodes of the series, dubbed 'Yearbook', followed a narrative of the kids creating the school yearbook. A year before the end of The Kids Of Degrassi Street, Schuyler announced Degrassi Junior High in a November 1985 Toronto Star article: "We'll launch a new series in about one year – Degrassi Junior High. The very last segment (in Yearbook) shows the kids graduating. Where are they going? Degrassi Junior High!". Work began on the new series by early 1986. The show was not a direct sequel, but rather a spinoff of the previous series.

Casting 
Schuyler explained that the show's age-appropriate casting was because "so much of the American stuff set in high schools is played by late teens and early 20s – and then some". Auditions took place throughout schools in Toronto; an estimated 300 kids auditioned and fifty-four were selected. Pat Mastroianni, who played Joey Jeremiah, was the first to audition. The selected fifty-four would undergo a three-week workshop that took place from 26 May to 13 June 1986 which helped them with basic acting skills, techniques and improvisation and included seminars in the behind-the-scenes aspects of production. The workshops would be repeated at the beginning of production for each season, as new cast members joined, and existing cast members underwent more advanced workshops.

Characters would be developed based on the strengths of the actors; those who did exceptionally well would have their roles expanded. The actors comprised The Playing With Time Repertory Company (referred to by Kathryn Ellis as "the Repco"), which at its peak consisted of sixty-five kids. The idea of the repertory company meant that there was no bias towards a particular set of actors on screen; major characters could be background extras in one episode, as minor characters could get a major role or focus, a practice very rare on television. The actors would also earn school credits for being in the repertory company. The actors were required to avoid missing more than eight days of their real school, but those with prominent roles usually missed three to four days a week. They would also be usually helped by a tutor, who would also administer tests and exams. The parents of the teenage actors were also given scripts of which their child was a prominent role and were consulted about the issues the show would address before they joined the company, but none of them "wanted their kid taken out". On set, the teenage actors would also usually run errands, including washing dishes and moving sandbags.

Hope, Mistysyn, Granofsky, Charlesworth and others returned to the new series with different characters. Stephen Stohn, who later co-founded Epitome Pictures with Schuyler and executive produced Degrassi: The Next Generation, served as the show's legal counsel.

Filming 

Principal photography of the series usually took place from April to December. Filming for the show began on 8 July 1986 in Etobicoke, Ontario. and finished in December 1988. The school used in the show was Vincent Massey Public School (then known as Daisy Avenue Public School) in Etobicoke, Ontario. At the time, the building was partially unused by the school board, except for the ground floor, which housed a private school; as a result, most of the interior scenes were filmed upstairs, with brief shots filmed on the ground below. The actors would routinely gather at the Playing With Time production office and be taken via a minivan to the school, where shooting would take place from 9:00a.m to 6:30p.m. One of the rooms, which was used as a library, served as a green room. The principal's office that students are seen entering and exiting did not actually exist, with the door opening to a blank wall. The lockers in the school were arranged to create an "illusion" of corridors. 

The series was filmed entirely on-location throughout the Greater Toronto Area. Places seen on the series include Queen-Broadview Village, which contained the real De Grassi Street as well as a building similar to that of Vincent Massey's, Dundas Street Junior School, which coincidentally served as the location for the school in The Kids of Degrassi Street, that served as a background double; this was done to make it seem like that neighbourhood was near the school, when in reality it was not. Various real life stores and other locations are shown and mentioned in the series, such as the Shoppers Drug Mart location on the corner of Queen & Carlaw streets, where various characters are seen shopping. Other locations, such as the Degrassi Grocery and the Broadview Community Health Clinic featured in the episode "It's Late" no longer exist. Earl Grey Senior Public School in Toronto, where Linda Schuyler was a teacher prior to Degrassi, served as the setting for Borden High School, where several grade 9 students attend science classes in the show's third season due to student overpopulation.

Episode production 
Following the first read-through of the script, which would take place in a circle, Linda Schuyler sought significant input from the teenage actors on the credibility of its dialogue. Many of the show's ideas were drawn from the actor's personal experiences, the writers' own teenage experiences, and "official idea sessions" with the actors. Yan Moore noted in 2005: "In the old days, the kids would come to the office...and they'd tell us things." For instance, actor Siluck Saysanasy, who played Yick Yu, was forbidden to get an earring by his father, but was only allowed if he got one for the show; writer Yan Moore would write an earring into the script for Saysanasy. Amanda Stepto also experienced occasional harassment in public for her spiked hair, which became a minor plot point in the series. A typical episode would take two weeks to rehearse and two weeks to film. Each episode cost approximately $250,000 to $350,000 to produce; the first season cost $2.6 million.

The writers intentionally avoided pop culture references to avoid dating the show, and created fictional pop culture within the universe. This included bands such as "Gourmet Scum", movies such as "Teen Academy IV" and "Swamp Sex Robots", game shows such as "Quest for the Best", and soap operas such as "Days Of Passion". Sex educator Sue Johanson played "Dr. Sally", who hosts a radio talk show similar to Johanson's "Sex with Sue".

Music 
Wendy Watson and Lewis Manne, who worked on the music for The Kids Of Degrassi Street, composed, arranged and performed all of the original music for Degrassi Junior High, including its theme song, which was sung by Watson. Watson and Manne recorded the show's music using a drums, bass, guitar and keyboard arrangement. Songs by various Canadian recording artists, including Watson and Manne's own music, were used for school dances and radios.

The garage band The Zit Remedy is formed late into the first season by characters Joey Jeremiah, Archie "Snake" Simpson, and Derek "Wheels" Wheeler. The band have only one song, "Everybody Wants Something", jokingly described by Kathryn Ellis as "Lewis's biggest hit". The song was written by a nephew of Watson and Manne on the back of a school permission letter, and sent to them. Actors Pat Mastroianni, Stefan Brogren and Neil Hope were musically inexperienced, and would be taught by Manne on how to play their instruments. In the book Exit Stage Left, the Zit Remedy have a second song, entitled, "I Don't Want To Be A Porcupine With Anyone Else But You, Baby", which Joey claims will "revolutionize the pop music industry". Stories around the group continue in Degrassi High, where their name is shortened to The Zits.

Opening sequence 

The "documentary-style" opening sequence follows the show's 30–60-second cold open. The sequence begins with a stop-motion live-action scene of a person picking up a group of textbooks, labeled "History", "Geography", "Math" and "English", and walking away. It mostly consists of scenes from various episodes of the characters in and around the school, juxtaposed with images of students with blackboard-esque transitions. The opening sequence does not credit the cast members.

The theme song that accompanies the opening sequence is an upbeat track sung by show co-composer Wendy Watson, in the key of C major and driven by synthesizers and guitars. It begins with a pessimistic tone, with the narrator feeling uncertain about going to school. The lyrics turn optimistic as the narrator notices "that someone is smiling right at me". It concludes with the lyrics "Everybody can succeed, all you need is to believe/Be honest with yourself, forget your fears and doubts/Come on give us a try at Degrassi Junior High!". Anne Weiss of Cinema Canada magazine described the theme song as having a "chirpy, almost inane melody". Shamus Kelley of Den of Geek called it ""inspirational", and said: "For a show that’s all about slice of life and dealing with big problems, it’s perfect." but had mixed feelings about the visuals, feeling that its emphasis on random shots of characters did not properly establish them. An instrumental variation of the opening theme is used in the end credits. The theme song was later reworked with different lyrics for Degrassi High.

Makeup and wardrobe 
In an unconventional practice for television, Degrassi Junior High did not have a makeup and wardrobe department. The cast would usually wear their own clothes and apply their own makeup, although the art department would tweak their appearances for continuity purposes. Neil Hope, who played Derek "Wheels" Wheeler, stated: "It's looking phony. [...] When you look more natural, its helping the show." Some of the clothing choices however were not of the actors; actress Nicole Stoffman did not dress like her sexually provocative character Stephanie Kaye. However, the "outrageously-coiffed" hair of character Christine "Spike" Nelson, was the real hair of actress Amanda Stepto, who was an avid fan of punk rock music.

Episodes

Degrassi Between Takes 
Degrassi Between Takes is a half-hour documentary special that aired on 30 October 1989, a week before the premiere of the sequel series Degrassi High, on CBC. The documentary is a behind-the-scenes look at Degrassi Junior High, shot during the show's third season and narrated by Peter Gzowski. The special focuses on the development and impact of the series, with footage of the cast at the Gemini Awards, working on set, socializing in public and on publicity tours.

Release

Initial broadcast 
The series premiered on CBC on 18 January 1987 and concluded on 27 February 1989. From its debut, the show ran on Sundays at 5:00p.m. Starting from its second season, due to a budget squeeze, it was then moved to Monday nights at 7:30p.m, and then later by then-new CBC programming chief Ivan Fecan, who championed the series to primetime at 8:30p.m, between the popular American series Kate & Allie and Newhart. Fecan was one of the biggest proponents of the series and viewed it as a standard for Canadian television writers; in 1988, he stated that there was "nothing bogus about that show", and that he wished that he had "20 more shows like it". When Fecan called Schuyler to inform her of the move, she reportedly disagreed, feeling that the series wasn't ready for prime time. She eventually agreed to the decision, under the condition that if the move was unsuccessful, the series wouldn't be cancelled and instead be moved back to its original timeslot. Following its move to prime time, the viewership increased 40 percent.

In the United States, the Public Broadcasting Service (PBS) debuted the series on 26 September 1987. On PBS, the show aired on Saturdays at 7:00p.m. In New York City, the series aired on Tuesdays at 6:00p.m. on WNET starting from 22 September 1987. The first two thirteen-episode seasons were aired as one twenty-six-episode season during the 1987–88 television season. The third season premiered in the United States on 10 December 1988 with the series finale airing on 15 April 1989. The program was distributed through PBS member station WGBH-TV in Boston, who also offered financial support for the show. Due to PBS's lack of commercials, the American airings often featured scenes that were not seen in Canada.

By November 1988, Degrassi Junior High was being shown in over forty countries, including Australia, Greece, China, France, and the United Kingdom. In the United Kingdom, where it began airing on the BBC starting from 5 April 1988, several episodes from the first season were banned, including several episodes about Spike's pregnancy and the episode "Rumour Has It", which involved rumors of a teacher and a student being homosexual. Despite the banned episodes airing on DEF II on BBC2, the rest of the series was not aired. The series concluded its BBC run on 10 May 1988, with re-runs of the aired episodes from the first season continuing into 1989. In Australia, the show debuted on ABC TV on 8 February 1988, as part of The Afternoon Show hosted by James Valentine, where it aired at 5:00p.m. The series finale aired in Australia on 10 October 1989.

In France, Junior High and High were aired under the banner Les Années collège (The College Years) on Antenne 2 starting from September 10, 1988.

Re-runs and syndication 
In Canada, the series re-ran on CBC starting from summer 1991. On 1 September 1997, the show began to air in re-runs on Showcase. In the United States, the series was rerun on Showtime starting from 14 August 1994, in its original 1987 CBC timeslot. Starting from 8 October 2005, coinciding with the premiere of Degrassi: The Next Generation's fifth season, the show along with its sequel debuted on the Noggin block The N with a two-hour block, followed by standard re-runs.

In Australia, re-runs aired starting on ABC from 1992. It later re-ran on ABC1's Rollercoaster and ABC2. By 2001, it had been syndicated in over seventy countries. In the United Kingdom, UK Gold screened Degrassi Junior High daily starting from its launch in 1992. Later in the mid-1990s, Degrassi Junior High later reran on The Children's Channel.

Use in schools 
The series was often shown in schools as part of health and sex education curricula. Educational materials relating to the series were released by WGBH in the United States during its original run, including discussion & activity guides. 25,000 copies of the Degrassi Junior High Discussion and Activity Guide were distributed to educators. In 1989, ten schools in Omaha, Nebraska were reported as using the first season of the series in their seventh and eighth grade human growth and development curriculum.

Home media and streaming 

The series has seen multiple home video releases as well as releases to streaming. In the United States, the series is distributed on home video by WGBH Boston Home Video, who released a twenty-one volume VHS boxset in 2000. WGBH would later release it on DVD in Region 1 in 2005. Each season was released separately followed by a complete 9-disc boxset. The 2005 WGBH box set, as well as the individual sets, include various special features, including the Degrassi Talks series, the 1989 Degrassi Between Takes documentary, printable materials, wallpapers, and a pop quiz.

In Region 4, the show's home media releases are distributed by Beyond Home Entertainment (under the imprint Force), who released a seven-disc set in 2006, including an extra disc containing special features. The special features are similar to the Region 1 box set, omitting the pop quiz. The series was also made available on YouTube.

Reception and impact

Critical reception 
Degrassi Junior High was a critical and commercial success as well as a cultural phenomenon in Canada, where it is considered one of the country's greatest television achievements. It established the franchise's popularity and longevity. According to American psychiatrists David A. and Beatrix Hamburg, research on adolescent reactions to the series found that young viewers found it  "exceptionally appealing", highly effective in presenting their issues, and successful in stimulating in-depth discussion.  Favourable reviews regularly came from critics from the Toronto Star, the Globe and Mail, the Ottawa Citizen, and the Montreal Gazette. The Canadian press, including CBC itself, celebrated the series and its international success and considered it to be one of the most groundbreaking and one of the greatest children's television series of all time. In particular, Toronto Star film and television critic Jim Bawden's regular championing of the series was credited by cast member Stefan Brogren with influencing its move to prime time. After its move to prime time, critics felt it had been well deserved.

It was also a cult hit and received favourable reviews in the United States. Speaking of the show's upcoming premiere on PBS, Fred M. Hechinger of the New York Times pondered whether the show's then-uncommon way of addressing adolescent issues would have an impact; "Can teen-agers be won over to entertainment that is not mindless, violent or sexually irresponsible?". In 1989, in the lead-up to the premiere of its third season, the series was profiled by John Fisher Burns, also of the New York Times, who asserted it was "remolding the pat-a-cake image of what the industry, with at least some sense of paradox, likes to call ''children's television.'" Writing for New Jersey's The Record, Joel Pitsezner remarked that he was so impressed with the series that he skipped two press conferences to watch more episodes, citing in particular the "intelligent and sensitive writing" of Yan Moore, the "believable interplay" between the actors, and in particular the portrayal of the "pain and awkwardness of the early teen years", the latter of which he believed to be its best quality.

Praise for the series was often directed to its portrayal of controversial topics, its casting choices, character development, balance of comedy and drama, cinematography, writing and low-budget production, which critics felt offered a more sincere and realistic depiction of adolescence in opposition to other youth and family-focused television programs of the period, which were widely viewed as trivializing serious issues and leaning heavily towards moralism. Writing for the Edmonton Journal, Bob Remington described the show and its characters as an exception to the "unrealistically antiseptic" television series such as The Cosby Show and Our House. Dave Rhein, in a review for wire service Gannett, declared that it "put to shame" other efforts to make a realistic show targeted towards teenagers. Other critics, including Janice Kennedy of the Montreal Gazette, who also often covered the series in her Children's Television column, and Anne Weiss of Cinema Canada magazine, praised the show's cinematography; Kennedy praising the producer's decision to shoot on film instead of video tape, and Weiss suggesting its "highly developed psychological use of the camera" was influenced by soap operas. The portrayal of the characters was praised by Steve Sonsky of the Miami Herald, who felt that it differentiated the series from others with teenage characters that were less realistically problematic.

Retrospectively, the series has continued to receive critical acclaim. Ian Warden of The Canberra Times, speaking of the show's continued reruns on ABC-TV, asserted in 1995 that it was "perhaps the best sustained piece of children's television drama ever made". In 2000, Leah McLaren of the Globe and Mail would recall disliking the series with her friends as a teenager, before later appreciating the "raw beauty" of the series as an adult. In addition, McLaren called it "way ahead of its time, both aesthetically and conceptually". Ottawa Citizen critic Tony Atherton, in a mixed review of the premiere episode of Degrassi: The Next Generation, made numerous comparisons between the characters of the older and newer series, and felt that due to the "deluge of teen dramas since". Next Generation would not make the same impact as the "groundbreaking" original series. David Berry of the National Post noted the difference between the show and the "slicker" Next Generation, saying that it was "like someone snuck a piece of avant-garde socialist realism onto mainstream network airwaves".

Reviewing the DVD release of its first season in 2007, Andrew Mickel of Den of Geek felt the show still held up twenty years after its debut, and singled out the character of Joey Jeremiah, which he compared to Ferris Bueller, as being a "big casting draw". Although also praising the series for its realism and sincerity, Exclaim!'''s Noel Dix felt that the DVD release leaned too much towards having an educational purpose rather than having "the fans in mind". Brodie Lancaster of the Sydney Morning Herald commented on the age-appropriate casting, calling it a "rare occurrence in the genre" of teen drama.

 Television ratings 
In Canada, the show reached a quarter of the adolescent viewing audience aged 12 to 17. In total, it received a 4 percent share of the viewing audience, which translated to several million viewers, despite minimal funding from the US public broadcasting system. By season two, Degrassi Junior High was receiving an average of 1.4 million viewers with a peak of 1.9 million, aided by its move to a prime time slot. The show's season 3 premiere, the two-parter "Can't Live With 'Em", drew 1.7 million viewers. The number accounted for 21 percent of the entire audience during that slot. By 1988, Degrassi Junior High was the highest-rated drama series in Canada.

In the United Kingdom, the series drew in six million followers by 1988, making it the highest-rated children's television series in the country, despite the BBC banning several of its episodes.

 Awards and nominations Degrassi Junior High has received twenty-eight awards, including eight Gemini Awards, three Parents' Choice Awards, three Chris Awards, and one International Emmy Award. The series won a Rockie Award for Best Continuing Series at the Banff Television Festival in 1988, where it drew praise from MTM Enterprises senior vice president and judge Laurence Bloustein, and marked the first time it had won an award outside of children's categories. Despite the win, the next year's festival saw an episode that addressed AIDS unanimously rejected for being "sloppily executed". The episode "It's Late" won the International Emmy Award for Children & Young People in 1987, and the series was nominated again for the award in 1988 for the second season episode "Great Expectations".

Out of the eight Gemini Awards won by the series, including one won in 1987 for Best Children's Series, it won four in 1988, including Best Continuing Dramatic Series, and Best Direction in a Dramatic Comedy Series for Kit Hood. When one award was announced, thirty four cast members took the stage. Furthermore, actors Pat Mastroianni and Stacie Mistysyn won the Best Leading Actor and Best Leading Actress in a Dramatic Role awards in 1988 and 1989 respectively. Mastroianni's win in particular was considered an upset, as he had beaten several established Canadian actors such as Scott Hylands and Donnelly Rhodes. Nineteen members of the cast, including Mastroianni, Mistysyn, Amanda Stepto, Stefan Brogren and Neil Hope were nominated for the Young Artist Award for Outstanding Young Ensemble Cast in 1990, but lost to A Mother's Courage: The Mary Thomas Story. Influence on teen drama Degrassi Junior High was one of the first drama series in Canada to exclusively target teenage audiences. Michelle Byers. editor of Growing Up Degrassi, states that while largely excluded from most discussions about teen television, Degrassi was "probably one of the earliest examples of the genre". According to the book The Greatest Cult Television Shows of All Time, the series was a trailblazer for future teen-oriented drama series "mainly because it understood teenage culture better than almost any other show produced before or since". The series is widely described as an early teen drama and an influence on several key series of the genre. most specifically Beverly Hills, 90210, which Degrassi Junior High is frequently compared to. For many years, an urban legend, supported by Pat Mastroianni, circulated that American television producer Aaron Spelling had attempted to adapt the series for a US audience, but was unsuccessful, and instead created Beverly Hills, 90210. Linda Schuyler denied the rumor in 2008, but indicated Spelling may have been aware of Degrassi. The Guardians Sarah Hughes suggested that Beverly Hills, 90210 was "Spelling's answer" to Degrassi Junior High. Writing about the death of actor Neil Hope, the New York Timess Paul Vitello said the show anticipated Beverly Hills 90210 as well as the MTV's The Real World. It has also been named as an influence on Dawson's Creek, 7th Heaven, and Felicity. Various academic studies have been written about the comparison between Degrassi and American teen drama series.

 Promotion and fan reaction 
The cast members became national celebrities as a result of the show's success. They would often embark on promotional tours across North America and even in Europe for the series during its run. They were primarily accompanied by Kathryn Ellis, who acted as the publicist. When travelling by plane, one of the actors would be in charge of checking the others through the airport. They were warmly received in most places, and participated in various cultural activities. The actors frequently visited Halifax, Nova Scotia in particular.

The success of the show led to the actors making appearances at public service events. For instance, Bill Parrott, who played Shane McKay, co-hosted the launch of the Kids Help Phone hotline in Toronto. The actors often participated in meet-and-greets and book signings at shopping malls and other places, where they drew a reaction comparable to Beatlemania. The actors were also sometimes conflated with their characters by fans and viewers. Amanda Stepto, who portrayed Spike, was mistaken for being pregnant like her character, and often received baby products and toys. Kit Hood expressed his concerns over the fan reactions: "That's what scares me is that the audience sometimes expects the kids to have knowledge about their characters that they don't have in real life".

Despite their international fame, and an on-set tutor, the actors were still required to attend school, and some recalled their teachers not being lenient about their busy schedules. Pat Mastroianni recalled that his geography teacher gave him a low grade despite succeeding in other subjects; Rebecca Haines recalled her parents threatening to remove her from the show if her grades were low enough. Speaking to the Edmonton Journal, Haines stated: "Some teachers can be jerks about it. [...] When you get home at eight at night, after working all day, you don't feel like writing an essay".

 UNICEF partnership 
In 1989, UNICEF Canada entered a partnership with Degrassi Junior High, with the cast being named UNICEF Goodwill Ambassadors. The cast members would make various appearances and appear in several public service announcements. Pat Mastroianni and Amanda Stepto flew to New York City to tour the Headquarters of the United Nations and meet other ambassadors. That same year, coinciding with the Convention on the Rights of the Child (which was ratified by Canada in 1991), a ten-minute video called The Degrassi Kids Rap On Rights that was distributed in Canadian schools nationwide. The video, narrated by Amanda Stepto, focused on the impending ratification of the Convention and highlighted the childhood experiences of several cast members in refugee camps and natural disasters.

 In popular culture 
American filmmaker Kevin Smith was a particular fan of Degrassi Junior High, having discovered it while working at a convenience store in New Jersey, and acknowledged an infatuation with Stacie Mistysyn and her character Caitlin Ryan. Smith wrote a piece about his enthusiasm for the series for Details magazine in November 1996, where it is claimed that he spent $3,000 on the series on home video. Smith has referenced the series several times in his work, including Clerks, which features a character named Caitlin Bree, and Chasing Amy. He attempted to cast Mistysyn in his 1995 film Mallrats in the role of Rene Mosier, but was denied by Universal Pictures, who wanted a better-known name. As a compromise, Smith made Shannen Doherty, who got the role, wear a Degrassi jacket for the character. Smith, along with Jason Mewes, guest-starred on and wrote several episodes of Degrassi: The Next Generation, in which they play fictional versions of themselves filming a Jay and Silent Bob movie at the school. Smith later wrote the introduction to The Official 411: Degrassi Generations by Kathryn Ellis.

Reviewing the 2005 film Harry Potter and the Goblet of Fire, Boston Globe critic Ty Burr quipped that it sometimes felt like "Degrassi Junior High with dragons".

 Cult following and legacy 
The series endured a significant cult following after its initial broadcast. Throughout the 1990s, an online fan community emerged, with the creation of various fansites about Degrassi Junior High and its sequel series. The fan sites, part of a webring created by Mark Aaron Polger, featured multimedia related to the show and spawned fan fiction, including a 1998 story called Degrassi: The Next Generation that centred around Spike's daughter Emma and included a character named Paige, similar to the real series of the same name that debuted in 2001. In 1996, a website named Degrassi Update appeared which chronicled public sightings of the Degrassi Junior High cast and drew mixed responses from cast members. A small reunion was organized on 24 August 1999 at Centennial College where the sequel series was filmed, and the cast reunited on the CBC youth show Jonovision, hosted by Jonathan Torrens, on 24–25 December 1999. The Jonovision reunion, which according to Torrens saw in-studio viewers attend from as far as San Francisco, served as a catalyst for the development of Degrassi: The Next Generation.Epitome Pictures (the company that eventually produced Next Generation) would later send Polger a draft statement of claim over his use of the Degrassi name, claiming he was confusing the public, and threatening legal action. After he sent various media outlets a press release, and garnered support from other fans of the series, Epitome withdrew the claim. Polger criticized Epitome Pictures for showing a lack of gratitude for the online community's impact on the show's continued success.

In 2017, the series was named by the Toronto International Film Festival as one of Canada's 150 most significant contributions to the cinematic landscape. Pat Mastroianni, after appearing at numerous fan conventions, later organized Degrassi Palooza, a convention celebrating the legacy of the 1980s Degrassi series and featuring a reunion of 26 cast and crew members, at the Westin Toronto Airport Hotel in mid-June 2019.

 Print media 

Starting from 1988, a series of mass-market paperback novelizations were released by James Lorimer & Co. The books would often centre on a particular character on the show and expanded upon storylines from the series, although the novel Exit Stage Left, which centres around various students as they organize a school play, is original. A thirteenth book, based on the characters Arthur Kobalewscuy and Yick Yu and written by Kathryn Ellis, remains unreleased.

The books were also published in other places; in Australia, they were published by ABC in November 1990, with more published in January 1991. The books also saw French Canadian releases by Les Éditions de Minuit.

 See also 
 The Kids Of Degrassi Street — predecessor to Degrassi Junior High featuring some of its actors in different roles
 Degrassi High — sequel series of Degrassi Junior High, following the same characters in high school
 Degrassi: The Next Generation — 2001 reboot of the series, featuring several characters from Degrassi Junior High'' as adults

Notes

References

Sources

Further reading

External links

Official Degrassi website

Degrassi Junior High
1980s Canadian teen drama television series
1987 Canadian television series debuts
1989 Canadian television series endings
Television series about bullying
CBC Television original programming
Canadian television soap operas
English-language television shows
Teenage pregnancy in television
Television shows set in Toronto
Television shows filmed in Toronto
Television series by DHX Media
Gemini and Canadian Screen Award for Best Drama Series winners
1980s Canadian LGBT-related drama television series
Television series about teenagers
Middle school television series
Fictional schools
Works about puberty
Coming-of-age television shows